Karnataka State Highway 3, commonly referred to as KA SH 3, is a normal state highway that runs north through Ramanagara, Bangalore Rural and Tumkur districts in the state of Karnataka, India.  This state highway touches numerous cities and villages Viz.Kanakapura, Ramanagara, Magadi and Pavagada. The total length of the highway is 249 km. 
SH 3 intersects with NH 209 at Kanakapura Town. Kanakapura is located from 32 km from Hunasanahalli & 27 km from Ramanagara.

Route description 
The route followed by this highway is Hunasanahalli – Kanakapura – Ramanagara – Magadi – Gudemaranahalli – Shivagange – Dobbaspete – Sompura -Koratagere – Madhugiri – Pavagada – Chikkahalli

Major junctions

National Highways 
 NH 209 at Kanakapura
 NH 73 at Gudemaranahalli
 NH 48 and NH 207 at Dobbaspet
 NH69 at Madhugiri

State Highways 
 KA SH 92 at Kanakapura
 KA SH 3 at Kanakapura
 KA SH 17 and KA SH 94 at Ramanagara
 KA SH 85 at Magadi
 State Highway 94 (Karnataka)

Connections 
Many villages, cities and towns in various districts are connected by this state highway.

See also
 List of State Highways in Karnataka

References

State Highways in Karnataka
Roads in Ramanagara district
Roads in Bangalore Rural district
Roads in Tumkur district
Transport in Tumkur